George W. Andrews Lake is a U.S. Army Corps of Engineers lake 29 miles south of Walter F. George Lake and north of Lake Seminole in Early County, Georgia.  The lake is very riverine in nature but is noted for good fishing.  The purpose of the dam is for river navigation via the lock at George W. Andrews Dam.  There is no hydroelectric generation at this location.  The lake is named for Alabama politician George W. Andrews, a strong proponent of racial segregation in the United States.

External links
 

Dams in Georgia (U.S. state)
United States Army Corps of Engineers dams
LGeorge W. Andrews
Protected areas of Early County, Georgia
Reservoirs in Georgia (U.S. state)
Bodies of water of Early County, Georgia